Pei Chensong (Chinese: 裴晨淞; Pinyin: Péi Chénsōng; born 30 July 1993) is a Chinese football player.

Club career
Pei joined Chinese Super League side Guangzhou R&F from Liaoning Whowin in February 2013. He was promoted to the first team squad by Sven-Göran Eriksson in the 2014 season. On 22 October 2016, he made his senior debut in a 3–1 away defeat against Beijing Guoan, coming on for injury Cheng Yuelei at the beginning of second half. He started for Guangzhou R&F in the last two matches of the season against Liaoning and Shijiazhuang Ever Bright, respectively.

In July 2017, Pei was loaned to Guangzhou R&F's satellite team R&F in the Hong Kong Premier League. On 19 September 2017, he made his debut in a 3–2 away loss to Hong Kong Pegasus. After playing two league match for R&F, he lost his position to Zhou Yuchen and returned to Guangzhou R&F in January 2018.

On 7 March 2018, Pei was loaned to China League Two side Hainan Boying until 31 December 2018.

Career statistics 
 

1League Cups include Hong Kong Senior Challenge Shield, Hong Kong League Cup and Hong Kong Sapling Cup.

References

1993 births
Living people
Chinese footballers
Association football goalkeepers
Footballers from Dalian
Guangzhou City F.C. players
R&F (Hong Kong) players
Chinese Super League players
Hong Kong Premier League players